Regina Abelt (born 12 May 1954) is a German-born public figure who served as the first First Lady of Ethiopia from 22 August 1995 until 8 October 2001.

Background
Abelt was born in Germany. She worked as an aid worker in Rwanda from 1979 to 1983. Abelt was one of the many foreign nurses working in the western Oromia Region where she met her future husband, Dr. Negasso Gidada, who was also a student at Germany's Goethe University Frankfurt. Even though she held German citizenship, Regina became the First Lady of Ethiopia by virtue of her marriage to the then President Dr. Negasso.

See also 
 First Lady of Ethiopia

References 

1954 births
Living people
People from Moers
First ladies of Ethiopia
Goethe University Frankfurt alumni
German emigrants to Ethiopia
Ethiopian people of German descent